is a railway station on the Iida Line in the town of Matsukawa, Shimoina District, Nagano Prefecture, Japan operated by Central Japan Railway Company (JR Central).

Lines
Ina-Ōshima Station is served by the Iida Line and is 143.1 kilometers from the starting point of the line at Toyohashi Station.

Station layout
The station consists of two opposed ground-level side platforms connected by a level crossing.  The station is staffed.

Platforms

Adjacent stations

History
Ina-Ōshima Station opened on 13 July 1922. With the privatization of Japanese National Railways (JNR) on 1 April 1987, the station came under the control of JR Central. A new station building was completed in February 2009.

Passenger statistics
In fiscal 2016, the station was used by an average of 366 passengers daily (boarding passengers only).

Surrounding area
Matsukawa Town Hall
 Matsukawa Junior High School

See also
 List of railway stations in Japan

References

External links

 Ina-Ōshima Station information 

Railway stations in Nagano Prefecture
Railway stations in Japan opened in 1922
Stations of Central Japan Railway Company
Iida Line
Matsukawa, Nagano (Shimoina)